Paruroctonus silvestrii, the California common scorpion, is a species of scorpion in the family Vaejovidae.

References

 Ayrey R, Webber M (2013). "A new Vaejovis C.L. Koch, 1836, the second known vorhiesi group species from the Santa Catalina Mountains of Arizona (Scorpiones, Vaejovidae)". ZooKeys 270: 21-35.

Vaejovidae
Animals described in 1909